Emil Alfred Aschenkampff (Libau (now ) – , Riga) was a Baltic German architect.

Aschenkampff was born in Libau (present-day Liepāja) and studied architecture at Riga Polytechnic Institute (today Riga Technical University). He graduated in 1893 and set up his own architectural firm in Riga. In addition, he taught at Riga Crafts school and worked as a building inspector for the city's building board. Together with Max Scherwinsky he designed the buildings of the exposition in 1901 to celebrate the 700th anniversary of the founding of Riga. He designed  15 multi-storey apartments in Riga, most in Art Nouveau style. He died in Riga.

Gallery

See also
Art Nouveau architecture in Riga

References

Architects from Riga
1858 births
1914 deaths
People from Liepāja
Art Nouveau architects
Riga Technical University alumni
Baltic-German people